Cheirotonus is a genus of long-armed scarabs (subfamily Melolonthinae) with about 10 species with a distribution extending west along the Himalayas to Japan in the east. They live inside tree holes in montane forest and are attracted to lights. Males and females show differences in size and structure of the legs with males having elongated foretibiae. The pronotum is shiny green and the elytra are usually dark with orange patterning.

Eight to ten species, depending on the taxonomic treatment, are recognized:

 C. arnaudi  - Peninsular Malaysia
 C. battareli  - northern Vietnam
 C. formosanus  - Taiwan 
 C. gestroi  - Northeast India, Burma, Thailand, Vietnam
 =corompti 
 =henrici 
 =chiangdaoensis 
 C. jambar  - North Okinawa
 C. jansoni  - Burma, China, Vietnam
 = nankinensis 
 = szetshuanus 
 C. macleayi  - Bhutan, India, China
 C. parryi  - Burma, India, Laos, Thailand

References

Scarabaeidae genera